The Schinasi House is a , 35-room marble mansion located at 351 Riverside Drive on the Upper West Side of Manhattan in New York City. It was built in 1907 for Sephardic Jewish tobacco baron Morris Schinasi. The mansion was designed by Carnegie Hall architect William Tuthill and reportedly retains almost all of its historic detail, including a Prohibition-era trap door that once extended all the way to the river.

The structure was designated a New York City Landmark on March 19, 1974, and added to the National Register of Historic Places on April 23, 1980. It has been described as the last remaining detached single-family house in Manhattan that is still used as a residence. Since 2013, it has been owned by Mark Schwartz, a Goldman Sachs executive, who purchased it for $14 million.

Site 
The Schinasi Mansion sits in the Upper West Side neighborhood of Manhattan at Riverside Drive and West 107th Street, directly across from Riverside Park. When the mansion was built in the early 1900s there was limited development along Riverside Drive and Park, but the thought was that more mansions would be erected within the near future. Although there are a handful of single-family mansions along Riverside Drive, the prediction for this kind of development never reached its full potential. The largest single-family residence along Riverside Drive at the time was Charles Schwab's mansion, "Riverside", with 85 rooms and occupying a full block. It was later demolished, and thus the Schinasi mansion is now the largest single-family residence there.

The surrounding neighborhood is full of residential townhouses and apartment buildings. The Riverside Drive – West 105th Street Historic District, a block south, is made up of rowhouses and townhouses built between 1889 and 1902. There are also the Baumgarten House (1901) and the Master Apartments (1929) in the neighborhood.

Architecture

Form and facade
A unique characteristic of the mansion is that it is completely offset from all four sides, making it detached from all neighboring buildings. The building measures approximately 41 feet by 73 feet, taking up two typical New York City lots (usually 25 feet by 100 feet). Being completely detached allows the mansion to take advantage of treating all four sides of the building and also to create spaces such as a typical English basement. All four facades of the building were treated slightly differently. The front facade faces west toward Riverside Park, containing the main door that is flush with the exterior. The south facade on 107th Street contains end sections and a recessed center. The north section, which faces the neighboring building on Riverside Drive, contains the most elaborate treatment. The rear facade, or east side, contains a three-sided copper oriel at the second level. Since the Schinasi house is detached from the neighboring buildings, it is completely freestanding, and thus it is one of very few privately owned detached single-family residences in Manhattan.

The exterior is built completely of white Vermont marble, structurally and aesthetically. The roof is a mansard terra cotta and green tile with steel girders and copper cornices. The construction manager of the mansion, Charles T. Willis, predicted the house would cost $180,000 to build, and he was right. The mansion completed construction one year after it began in 1909.

Features
The Schinasi Mansion is made of various carved materials; on the interior there is a mix of Egyptian carved marble, hand carved wood, and hand painted frescos. Within the wood are intricately carved symbols and décor, and the pineapple, a symbol of hospitality, is repeated throughout all carvings.

The  residence contains entertainment and service rooms in the basement and first floor including a gym, servants quarters, dining room, gallery, waiting area, and two parlor rooms. The second and third levels contain the many bedrooms and bathrooms, along with sitting areas and kitchens as well. Finally on the top floor there is a studio apartment. In total there are twelve bedrooms, eight bathrooms, and five kitchens. When built there was a tunnel connecting the English basement of the mansion under Riverside Drive to the banks of the Hudson River. However this route has since been since sealed off.

The Schinasi Mansion was used originally as a single family home. That was the case during the twenty or so years that Schinasi and his immediate family lived there. However, after his death Schinasi's heirs sold the mansion and from then on it never saw the same use. Its use has ranged from a private girls finishing school to a daycare center to a location for law students gatherings. It has also been used as the home to June, the wife of a late conman, who rents the studio apartment to the fictional character Neal Caffrey in the popular USA Network show White Collar. The house is also used as a setting on the popular Hulu show The Mindy Project as 'The Bleecker Friends Quaker School for Toddlers' for Mindy's son, first seen in S4.

History
Completed in 1909 at the northeast corner of West 107th Street and Riverside Drive, the three-story, 12,000 square foot mansion was designed in neo-French-Renaissance style by William Tuthill., the same architect who designed Carnegie Hall. Morris Schinasi, an Ottoman-Jewish immigrant who made his millions in cigarettes, commissioned the design and owned the thirty-five-room mansion until his death in 1928. After that the mansion changed hands several times until 1979 when Hans Smit, a Columbia University law professor, bought it and commissioned an extensive interior restoration. It was designated a New York City landmark on March 19, 1974. The mansion is one of a kind, with rich details in every niche of the building. Pineapple motifs, seen as a symbol of hospitality, are repeated throughout the ornamentation and there was originally a tunnel, now closed up, that led under ground to the Hudson River. Until 2013 it was inhabited by Hans Smit's son.

On March 19, 1974, the Schinasi mansion was designated a New York City landmark. The Landmarks Preservation Commission found that this residence had “special character, special historical and aesthetic interest, and value as part of the development, heritage, and cultural characteristics of New York City.”

Morris Schinasi, who commissioned this mansion in 1909, was an Ottoman Jewish immigrant who came to the United States in 1890. He came from a family with little money and borrowed $25,000 (in US) from a friend to get to the United States. With him he brought a machine that would change his fortune – a cigarette-rolling machine he designed and presented at the Columbian Exposition held in Chicago in 1893. Until this point, every single cigarette had been hand rolled and therefore this novel device created a lot of interest. Soon after, his brother joined him in New York City and they established the Schinasi Brothers Company, which featured their brand “Egyptian Prettiest” cigarettes rolled with Turkish tobacco. The product became very popular and the brothers built their commercial empire from the ground up.

After Schinasi had made his fortune, and met his wife in 1903, he decided to build the mansion on Riverside Drive. At the time most mansions were being built along Park Avenue and Fifth Avenue, but it was predicted that patrons commissioning mansions would get tired of the hustle and bustle of the busy East Side and retreat to building their extravagant homes along the quieter Riverside Drive. As this prediction never came to fruition, the Schinasi mansion remains the largest single-family residence along Riverside Drive.

Schinasi selected William Tuthill as the architect for the mansion, but the relationship was not a pleasant one. Tuthill later sued Schinasi for a sum of $5655.65.

Schinasi lived at the mansion with his wife, Laurette, and three daughters, Victoria, Juliette, and Altina for almost twenty years. In 1928 Schinasi died at the age of seventy-one, and two years later his heirs sold the house to Semple Realty Corporation for $200,000. Since 1930, the mansion has seen many different visitors and uses, beginning as a Semple School for Girls that served as a finishing school for well to-do young ladies. It is said that in 1956 Mrs. Semple herself actually died in one of the mansion's thirty-five rooms. Columbia University was the next to purchase the building in 1960 and turned it into a daycare center known as “The Children’s Mansion”. In 1970–1971, the mansion housed a Columbia / Barnard coed residential program called the "Experimental College". Photographer Timothy Greenfield-Sanders was one of 45 residents. Columbia sold the mansion in 1979 to Columbia law professor Hans Smit and his wife for $325,000. At this time he initiated an interior restoration that took twenty years to complete.

During Smit's ownership, he never actually lived in the building, yet his brother's family did for several years during this time period. Smit also used the mansion for Columbia Law School gatherings and small parties. After Smit completed the restoration in 2006 he attempted to sell with an initial asking price of $31 million. Since then the mansion has made a handful of appearances on the real estate market. It was listed at $15 million in the fall of 2011. It is unconfirmed whether the mansion was sold at that time.

Mark Schwartz, a vice chairman at the investment bank Goldman Sachs, bought the Schinasi House in 2013.

See also 
 National Register of Historic Places listings in Manhattan from 59th to 110th Streets
 List of New York City Designated Landmarks in Manhattan from 59th to 110th Streets

References

External links

Houses completed in 1907
Houses in Manhattan
Houses on the National Register of Historic Places in Manhattan
New York City Designated Landmarks in Manhattan
Upper West Side